Teresa Nuñez (born 20 March 1951) is a Peruvian volleyball player. She competed at the 1968 Summer Olympics and the 1976 Summer Olympics.

References

External links
 

1951 births
Living people
Peruvian women's volleyball players
Olympic volleyball players of Peru
Volleyball players at the 1968 Summer Olympics
Volleyball players at the 1976 Summer Olympics
People from Ica, Peru
Pan American Games medalists in volleyball
Pan American Games silver medalists for Peru
Medalists at the 1971 Pan American Games
Medalists at the 1975 Pan American Games
20th-century Peruvian women